Carlos May (born May 17, 1948) is an American former professional baseball player. He played in Major League Baseball as an outfielder, first baseman and designated hitter from 1968 to 1977, most prominently for the Chicago White Sox where he was a two-time American League All-Star player. He also played for the New York Yankees and the California Angels. After his major league career, he played in the Nippon Professional Baseball league for the Nankai Hawks from 1978 to 1981. May is the younger brother of former professional baseball player, Lee May.

Early years
Carlos was born in Birmingham, Alabama. He attended A. H. Parker High School.

Major league career
He began his major league career on September 6, but did not have his first full year until . In , he suffered a severe injury while serving in the Marine Reserves, at Camp Pendleton in California. May was cleaning a mortar when it fired causing a partial amputation of his right thumb. He won the Sporting News Rookie of the Year Award, but lost to Lou Piniella for the Major League Baseball Rookie of the Year Award. In 1970, as the White Sox' full-time left fielder, he had a good breakout season, batting .285 with 12 home runs and 68 RBIs. However, the White Sox had a miserable year, finishing 50 games under .500 and in last place in the American League, 42 games out of first place. In  he batted .294 with 70 RBIs while playing regularly at first base for the only time in his career. He moved back to the outfield after an offseason trade brought superstar Dick Allen to the White Sox.

Throughout the early 1970s, May continued to help the White Sox improve as a solid everyday starter for them. In , he hit .308 and had 28 stolen bases, which would both end up his career-highs in the respective categories. That year, Chicago finished in 2nd place in the AL, behind only the Oakland Athletics. In  he collected 20 home runs and 96 RBIs, which would end up his career highs in those categories.

May did get a crack at postseason play, but not with the White Sox. On May 18, he was traded to the Yankees for pitcher Ken Brett and fellow outfielder Rich Coggins. The deal was made while the Yankees were in a heated pennant race. That year, he hit .278 and the Yankees went to the World Series. During the ALCS, May went 2-for-10 with a double and a walk. In the World Series against the Cincinnati Reds, he did not get a hit in 9 at bats and ended up with a .105 batting average in the postseason.

He was an All-Star in 1969 and 1972 and made the top 10 in batting average and stolen bases twice.

While playing for the White Sox he had the rare distinction of wearing his birthday on the back of his uniform, including his surname:  "MAY 17."

In a 10-year career, he hit .274 with 90 home runs and 536 RBIs in 1165 games. He had 85 career stolen bases and 545 runs scored. In 4120 at bats, he had 1127 career hits.
In 2012, May joined the coaching staff of the Schaumburg Boomers baseball team, in the Frontier League.

Personal life
May worked for the United States Postal Service for 20 years as a mail carrier and clerk after playing baseball. He is currently a community relations representative for the White Sox. May is the younger brother of Lee May, who played in the major leagues for eighteen seasons. In 1969, they were the first brothers to play against each other in the All Star Game, with Carlos representing the American League (AL) and Lee representing the National League (NL).

May is the only player in MLB history to wear his birthday on the back of his jersey by wearing No.17, which including the name reads as "May 17", when he began his Major League career in the White Sox.

References

External links

1948 births
Living people
African-American baseball players
Águilas del Zulia players
American expatriate baseball players in Japan
American League All-Stars
Appleton Foxes players
Baseball players from Birmingham, Alabama
California Angels players
Chicago White Sox players
Deerfield Beach/Winter Haven Sun Sox players
Florida Instructional League White Sox players
Gulf Coast White Sox players
Lynchburg White Sox players
Major League Baseball left fielders
Nankai Hawks players
New York Yankees players
United States Marines
21st-century African-American people
20th-century African-American sportspeople